LaTanya Garrett is a Democratic politician from Michigan currently representing the 7th District in the Michigan House of Representatives after being elected in November 2014.

Education and early career
Garrett attended schools in the Detroit area, and graduated from Henry Ford High School, Life Support Training Institute, and Wayne County Community College. As of January 2015, she is finalizing a bachelor's degree in medical case management from Davenport University.

Garrett has worked as a community activist and on several political campaigns. She has also worked as a licensed first responder, and is a small business owner.

Political career
Garrett was elected to the Michigan House of Representatives in 2014. She took office in January 2015, and was asked by Democratic Floor Leader Sam Singh to serve as one of his Assistant Democratic Floor Leaders.
State Rep. LaTanya Garrett, a wife and mother of three, said her family was top of mind when she wrote legislation introduced in the Michigan Legislature on Wednesday that would make it a felony to falsely report a crime based on a person’s race.
Committees (2015-2016)
 Agriculture
 Energy
 Commerce and Trade

Personal life 
Garrett is married with two children. Garrett is a resident of Detroit, Michigan.

References

External links
 

Living people
Democratic Party members of the Michigan House of Representatives
Politicians from Detroit
African-American state legislators in Michigan
Wayne County Community College District alumni
Women state legislators in Michigan
African-American women in politics
21st-century American politicians
21st-century American women politicians
Year of birth missing (living people)
21st-century African-American women
21st-century African-American politicians